The Fortune (French: La fortune) is a 1931 French film directed by Jean Hémard and starring Jane Marny, Alice Tissot and Simone Deguyse.

Cast
 Jane Marny as Bérangère  
 Alice Tissot as Mlle de Tavères  
 Simone Deguyse as L'artiste de cinéma  
 Claude Dauphin as Joannis  
 Daniel Lecourtois as Badoureau / Studel  
 Raymond Rognoni as M. Martelet  
 Henri Poupon as Saturnin 
 Armand Guy 
 Maryanne 
 Nitta-Jo as Maryane  
 Gil Roland

References

Bibliography 
 Crisp, Colin. Genre, Myth and Convention in the French Cinema, 1929-1939. Indiana University Press, 2002.

External links 
 

1931 films
1930s French-language films
Films directed by Jean Hémard
French black-and-white films
1930s French films